Uniracers, released as Unirally in PAL territories, is a racing game developed by DMA Design and published by Nintendo for the Super Nintendo Entertainment System in North America in December 1994 and in the PAL territories on April 27, 1995.

Gameplay 

The gameplay of Uniracers involves racing riderless unicycles around a 2D track. Heavy emphasis is placed on performing stunts. Performing stunts causes the unicycle to go faster on race or circuit tracks and earn points on stunt tracks. The stunts that can be performed are relatively simple, mostly only involving jumping in the air and rotating about a given axis in 3D space. The idea is to be able to perform these stunts quickly in tight situations while landing the unicycle on its wheel to avoid wiping out, which results in the loss of accumulated speed.

The game features nine tours of five tracks each (two race, two circuit, one stunt) for a total of 45. Beating each of the first eight tours requires defeating computer-controlled opponents for each of bronze, silver, and gold ranks. The last circuit features the Anti-Uni as the computer-controlled opponent. During that tour, touching the Anti-Uni causes several odd effects, such as the track becoming invisible, the controls reversing and backgrounds no longer moving in sync with the actions.

The track is made of bars with patterns on them which correspond to the track's properties at or near that point. For example, a solid yellow bar indicates a shortcut and orange/yellow bars indicates an upcoming hazard. There are also various obstacles like speed-ups, corkscrews, loops, twists, and jumps. Split-screen two-player modes are available as well, including a league mode that allows up to eight players to compete in one-on-one races. There are 16 different colored unicycles to choose from, each with a save file and customizable name.

Development and release 
Uniracers was known by the working title "1x1" during development. The developers practiced riding real unicycles through their office to aid their understanding.

Lawsuit 
Shortly after the game's release, DMA Design was sued by Pixar for allegedly copying the unicycle design and concept from their 1987 short film Red's Dream. Mike Dailly, one of the developers at DMA Design, commented, "The problem with Pixar was that they seemed to think that any computer generated unicycle was owned by them." DMA Design lost the lawsuit, and as a result, Nintendo had to terminate production of further Unirally cartridges. According to Dailly, "The deal was that Nintendo wouldn't make any more carts so Unirally only sold the 300k initial run". Fellow DMA Design developer Robbie Graham recalled, "They took footage from Red's Dream and compared it to Unirally and the unicycles were virtually the same; this isn't a big surprise as there’s not a lot of ways you can bring life to a unicycle without looking like the one Pixar did. The judge - being the moron that he was - agreed."

Reception 

GamePro gave the game a mixed review. They praised the fast pace and "hard-drivin' unicycle music", but criticized the sound effects and graphics, remarking that the backgrounds are clean but boring, and the unicycles "all look identical." They concluded that players should "try this addictive game." A reviewer for Next Generation similarly said that Uniracers is innovative and oddly compelling despite its surface dullness, but that the excitement and novelty of the game wear out before long. Ed Semrad of Electronic Gaming Monthly remarked that "While it lacks the charm of most ... Nintendo titles, there is bound to be a cult following." However, the other three members of the magazine's review crew all gave Uniracers a negative assessment, saying that while the graphics and controls are good, the game simply lacks excitement. Entertainment Weekly gave the game a B−.

Accolades

Nintendo Power ranked it as the 8th best SNES game of 1994. In 2011, IGN called it the 98th best game for the system. In 2018, Complex rated the game 52nd on their The Best Super Nintendo Games of All Time stating: "Loops, flips, tricks, Uniracers had it all. It was a bona fide SNES game, with the colors, fun, and music that made the system great. We love this game." In 1995, Total! placed the game 23rd on its Top 100 SNES Games writing: "It’s bizarre, but it works and unusually it’s superb in both one player and two player modes." In 1996, Super Play awarded Uniracers 97th in their Top 100 SNES Games of All Time.  They praised the game’s original gameplay, graphics writing: "The enjoyment of hammering around loops and twirls is heightened by the split-screen two-player mode, which makes all the difference."

References

External links 
 Uniracers at GameFAQs
 Uniracers at Giant Bomb
 Uniracers at MobyGames

1994 video games
Super Nintendo Entertainment System games
Super Nintendo Entertainment System-only games
Nintendo games
Racing video games
Video games developed in the United Kingdom
Multiplayer and single-player video games
DMA Design games